The 2002 Samoa National League, or also known as the Upolo First Division, was the 14th edition of the Samoa National League, the top league of the Football Federation Samoa. Strickland Brothers Lepea won their first title.

Standings
Known results from source:

Top scorers

References

Samoa National League seasons
Samoa
football